The Canadian federal budget for fiscal year 1973-1974 was presented by Minister of Finance John Turner in the House of Commons of Canada on 19 February 1973.

External links 

 Budget Speech
 Budget highlights

References

Canadian budgets
1973 in Canadian law
1973 government budgets
1973 in Canadian politics